European Route E 115 is a European B class road in Russia, connecting the cities Yaroslavl - Novorossiysk

Route 

: Yaroslavl - Moscow
: Moscow
 M4: (Concurrent with ) Moscow - Kashira
: Kashira - Voronezh - Kamensk-Shakhtinsky - Shakhty (Start of concurrency with) Rostov-on-Don - Pavlovskaya (End of concurrency with) - Krasnodar
: Krasnodar - Verkhnebakansk
: Verkhnebakansk - Novorossiysk

External links 
 UN Economic Commission for Europe: Overall Map of E-road Network (2007)

International E-road network
E115